Home and Away is an Australian television soap opera. It was first broadcast on the Seven Network on 17 January 1988. The following is a list of characters that appeared in 2021, by order of first appearance. All characters are introduced by the soap's executive producer, Lucy Addario. The 34th season of Home and Away began airing on 1 February 2021. Susie McAllister, Chloe Anderson and Mia Anderson were introduced during the same month. Sienna Blake, Allegra Freeman and Emmett Ellison made their debuts in April. Rachel Young arrived in late May, followed by Cash Newman in June. Logan Bennett and Felicity Newman were introduced in August. Theo Poulos made his debut in September.

Susie McAllister

Susan "Susie" McAllister, played by Bridie Carter, made her first appearance on 4 February 2021. Carter's casting details were announced on 10 August 2020. She began filming during the same week. Carter was pleased to be offered the role during the COVID-19 pandemic, calling it unexpected. She stated "I was astounded and ecstatic at the same time. I am very fortunate and very grateful because I have a lot of friends who are sitting in a very precarious position." Carter has previously appeared in the serial as Toni Jarvis and Brooke Taylor in 1995 and 1999. Susan is a real estate agent who relocates from Western Australia to Summer Bay. Carter described her as "a really fun, dynamic woman" and "fiercely independent". She also said Susan "befriends certain people quite particularly." Daniel Kilkelly of Digital Spy later reported that she would a possible love interest for John Palmer (Shane Withington). The character was killed off in June 2021, starting a whodunnit storyline.

Following her move to Summer Bay, Susie is first required to help Tori Morgan (Penny McNamee) and Christian Green (Ditch Davey) who are in search of a new home. She soon has her eye on John Palmer (Shane Withington) and approaches him while he is dining alone at Salt; the pair initially hit it off and Susie takes keen interest in John's personal life. The two eventually become more involved with one another and when Susie claims she has no place to live, John agrees to let her move in. Susie shows signs of suspicious behaviour when she begins asking questions and searching through John's bank statements, aside from feeling uninterested every time John touches her. Susie then persuades John to run for Surf Club president, much to Alf Stewart's (Ray Meagher) shock as it is unusual for anyone to run against him for president. Marilyn Chambers (Emily Symons) confronts John about his sudden change of character since he has started seeing Susie, causing her to clash with Susie on a number of occasions. Fed up with Marilyn's interference, Susie presents Marilyn with divorce papers from John. Following John's appointment as president, Susie persuades him to raise money for the Surf Club's renovation and she attempts to get sponsorship from local businesses such as the diner and the gym.

Leah Patterson (Ada Nicodemou) and Justin Morgan (James Stewart) decide to enlist Susie's help in finding them a new house, while Irene Roberts (Lynne McGranger), having felt that something was not right with Susie since she first arrived, become more suspicious of her. Susie sees Irene as a threat and accuses her of being attracted to John. John urges the women to make peace and invites them to dinner; Susie orders three glasses of wine and drugs Irene's drink, however, she is unaware that Irene is a teetotaler. John drinks the unwanted wine and become violently ill. Irene realises that the wine meant for her was drugged, which sparks her suspicions even further when Susie refuses to seek medical help for John. Justin and Leah receive the news that the house they believe was sold to them is not actually theirs. Irene and Willow Harris (Sarah Roberts) soon discover that Susie McAllister does not exist when they stumble across a photo of Susie with the name Imogen Simons attached. Susie tries to convince everyone that Irene is spreading lies about her and advises Justin and Leah that there was an administrative error with the house which she intends to rectify. All becomes clear when Susie decides it is time to flee with Justin and Leah's life savings, along with the Surf Club funds. Irene confronts her and Susie drugs her with chloroform. Susie finally makes her escape, leaving John heartbroken, while Justin and Leah realise that they have lost all $90,000 of their money, as there is no trace of anyone by the name of Susie McAllister.

Several weeks pass and Leah is still determined to find Susie, while trying to convince John to help her. She eventually comes into contact with another of Susie's victims, Stephen Tennyson (Bren Foster), via an online forum, who claims that he and Susie had a brief relationship before she ran off with his life savings. Leah, John and Stephen continue their search to no avail, until John receives text messages from Susie. They plan a meeting that proves unsuccessful when she does not appear. Susie's body is recovered from the ocean and it is determined that she was killed by blunt force trauma to the skull, not drowning. The police realise that Susie could not have sent the texts to John, as she was already dead. Justin becomes the prime suspect after Susie's phone is found in his car. Leah later realises Stephen is the culprit, after finding a burner phone, Susie's laptop, and her and Justin's money in his motel room. Stephen tries to escape Summer Bay with Leah in fear that she will turn him in, but is eventually arrested and charged with Susie's murder.

Chloe Anderson

Chloe Anderson, played by Sam Barrett, made her first appearance on 11 February 2021. Barrett's casting was announced in November 2020, after she was seen filming scenes at the show's outdoor location. Barrett told Stephanie McKenna of PerthNow that she had always wanted to appear in Home and Away, and she auditioned for the show five times, before she was cast as Chloe. Barrett had to relocate to Sydney, where the show's studios are located. She said the process from the audition to filming happened in "just a few weeks". She also said "My first day on set didn't even feel real, it felt a bit like a dream. I learn a lot every day from everyone, and from the crew as well. That's my favourite part about working on the show, everyone's always willing to help you as a new actor." Chloe is introduced along with her mother Mia Anderson (Anna Samson). They both have a connection to established character Ari Parata (Rob Kipa-Williams), who was in a relationship with Mia. Chloe saw Ari as a father figure before he went to prison. Chloe is billed as "a smart and sassy" young adult, who shares her mother's "intelligence and rebelliousness". Chloe comes to Summer Bay with her friend and Ari's nephew Nikau Parata (Kawakawa Fox-Reo), whom she meets in New Zealand. She hopes to reconcile the father/daughter relationship she had with Ari. Barrett felt that when it comes to Ari and Nikau, Chloe is "quite determined to reconnect." Chloe is also a potential love interest for Ryder Jackson (Lukas Radovich). The character's biological father Matthew Montgomery (James Sweeny) was introduced in November 2021. After 18 months in the role, Barrett made her last appearance as Chloe during an episode broadcast on 21 July 2022. The character leaves the Bay to join her mother Mia in New Zealand.

Chloe attempts to order an alcoholic cocktail at Salt, but Ryder Jackson refuses to make her one as she does not have her ID, so she orders a pizza instead. Chloe then meets up with Nikau Parata, who tells her that her presence is going to shake things up. Chloe returns to Salt and gives Ryder unwanted advice about making a good martini. Nikau takes Chloe to see his uncle Ari, her stepfather, who she has not seen in a number of years. She explains to him that she met Nikau while she was backpacking around New Zealand and that her mother, Mia, does not know she is in Summer Bay. Chloe has dinner with the family and is invited to stay for the night. The following day, Chloe and Ari talk about why she is in the Bay and how she felt when he went to prison. Chloe tells him that she was angry with him for missing so many moments in her life, but her mother told her that he did not want to see them anymore, which she knows is a lie. Ari tells Chloe that when he went to prison, he and her mother agreed that it was not a place for children to visit and he thought that she would explain this to Chloe. Chloe says that she and her mother just moved away. Ari urges Chloe to call her mother to let her know where she is. When Mia arrives, Chloe confronts her about the lies she told and refuses to leave with her, as she wants to stay and get to know Ari again. Nikau introduces Chloe to his girlfriend Bella Nixon (Courtney Miller) and helps her secure a job at Salt, after she goes up against Ryder in a cocktail making competition.

Mia Anderson

Mia Anderson, played by Anna Samson, made her first appearance on 11 February 2021. The character and Samson's casting details were announced on 3 January 2021. Mia is introduced as the former partner of Ari Parata (Rob Kipa-Williams) and mother of Chloe Anderson (Sam Barrett). Their arrival helps further exploration of Ari's fictional backstory, as it emerges that he went to prison after his and Mia's baby died. Mia then chose to move away with Chloe, who lost her father figure. Mia is reunited with Ari when she comes to Summer Bay to collect her daughter. She is billed as "an intelligent, gutsy and strong-willed mother-of-one." Samson departed the serial on 28 April 2022, after Mia decides she can no longer remain in the Bay following Ari's death. Chloe decides to stay in the Bay, but understands why Mia wants to leave. Barrett commented "Ari was her mum's soulmate and, in a lot of ways, the glue that held their family together." Ari's brother Tane Parata (Ethan Browne) gives Mia a ticket to New Zealand, so she can start over, and the family say their goodbyes after a pizza party.

Mia comes to Summer Bay after learning her daughter Chloe Anderson has followed Nikau Parata there. Mia's former partner Ari attempts to get in contact with Chloe and Nikau, and later learns that they have gone up the coast. Ari confronts Mia about the lies she told Chloe as they wait. Upon her return, Chloe also confronts her mother about lying about Ari and refuses to leave with her. Mia admits that she never meant to hurt her and she thought she was doing the right thing in order to protect her. Mia asks Chloe how she can fix things, but Chloe wants to stay in order to get her head around everything. Ari also refuses to help Mia, telling her that Chloe can stay for as long as she wants in order to get to know him again. The following day, Mia admits to Ari that she tried to tell Chloe the truth about his departure, but she struggled with all the questions. She tells him that she never meant to hurt either of them. Ari tells her that he understands why she did what she did. Chloe tells Mia that she has the chance of a job at a local restaurant and Mia agrees she can accept it. She then tells Ari that she intends to stay in the Bay too.

Sienna Blake

Sienna Blake, played by Rose Riley, made her first appearance on 29 April 2021. The character and Riley's casting was announced on 26 April. Sienna was introduced as part of a storyline exploring the world of modelling and photography involving Nikau Parata (Kawakawa Fox-Reo). Daniel Kilkelly noted that she shared a name and a "scheming" personality with a Hollyoaks character. He also said that as the storyline progresses, Sienna's ruthless side emerges and added "Has Nikau unknowingly made a deal with the devil?" Of Sienna first scenes, Stephanie McKenna of The West Australian observed: "It's the standard new character intro for this show, they all start out as baddies looking for trouble." McKenna thought Sienna was planning on making Nikau "her toy boy", and later branded her "the master manipulator".

Sienna contacts Nikau Parata after seeing an award-winning photograph of him and arranges a meeting. Nikau's uncle Ari Parata (Rob Kipa-Williams) also joins them and asks Sienna what she wants with his nephew. She offers Nikau a modelling contact, which he initially turns down, until she agrees to provide his girlfriend Bella Nixon (Courtney Miller) with an internship with a top photographer. Sienna is surprised when Nikau and Bella turn up together at SLM Management to create Nikau's portfolio. Sienna takes Nikau off to brief him on what to expect, and they join Bella and Emmett Ellison (Jaime Robbie Reyne) to take his first photographs. Nikau walks out on the session as he is uncomfortable, but soon returns and Emmett gets Bella to give him directions, which Sienna loves and she calls Nikau a natural. A few days later, Nikau is booked for a fashion campaign alongside Allegra Freeman (Laura McDonald), which is overseen by Sienna. She tells Nikau to attend a party thrown by the client and when Bella tries to get him out of it, Sienna tells her to re-read his contract. Days later, Sienna and Emmett turn up at the Parata's house. Sienna claims her PA forgot to call ahead and Ari invites them to stay for dinner. Nikau and Bella take them to Salt for drinks, where Sienna shows Nikau his new social media account. She arranges an impromptu photoshoot for Nikau and she invites Allegra along. Sienna asks Allegra to keep Nikau focused and stop him from looking bad, as he will be good for her career. During the shoot, Sienna makes Bella fetch coffees to get her out of the way, and she later tells Allegra to kiss Nikau which Bella witnesses. Nikau threatens to quit, but Sienna manipulates him by blaming Allegra and then telling him that Bella would also lose her internship. Nikau decides to continue after seeing his first pay cheque. Sienna encourages Nikau to increase his online follower count with the help of Allegra by hosting a pool party at his house. She overhears a disagreement between him and Bella, and she and Allegra later mention how relationships with those not in the industry do not work out. Nikau tells Sienna that he is committed to Bella, which leads her to tell Bella that she cannot use any photographs of Nikau in her exhibition, unless she pays his daily fee. Emmett and Bella try to reason with Sienna, and Nikau threatens to withdraw from a major fashion shoot in Japan if she does not release the photos. 

During another shoot, Sienna manipulates Allegra into creating a wedge between Nikau and Bella, after she learns that Nikau wants Bella to come to Japan with him. Nikau helps bring up a box of clothes to Sienna's apartment, and while he is waiting for a limo to take him to Bella's exhibition, Sienna tells him about her failed relationship with Emmett and tries to keep him from leaving. She tells Allegra to get something more, and when Allegra sends through photos of Emmett and Bella looking intimate, Sienna seduces Nikau and they have sex. The following day, Emmett is injured in an explosion and Nikau has to call Sienna to see if she has details of any family members. She later turns up in the Bay and Nikau confronts her about setting him up. Sienna spends the afternoon looking at Emmett and Bella's exhibition, while Nikau worries that she is going to tell Bella what happened between them. Nikau later tells Sienna that he is done with her, modelling, and he is not going to Japan because of what she did to him and Bella. Sienna responds by threatening to tell Bella what happened between them.

Sienna calls Nikau and Allegra for a last minute fashion shoot. Bella confronts Sienna and tells her that Nikau is not her pet. Sienna apologises and then offers Bella the chance to be the photographer for the shoot, after their photographer fell through. Bella accepts, but Nikau tells Sienna to leave her out of it. Bella sources a new location for the shoot, which goes well once Nikau relaxes. Allegra later tells Sienna that getting Nikau offside could jeopardise the Japan trip. Nikau's uncle Tane Parata (Ethan Browne) joins Sienna for a drink and she tries to seduce him, but he warns her not to mess with Nikau. Bella learns that Nikau cheated on her and she confronts Sienna, and has to be pulled away. Tane calls Sienna a player and tells her to leave town. Sienna gloats that she was always going to win and now Nikau is free to go to Japan. However, Nikau tells Sienna that he is done with modelling. Emmett comes across Sienna in the Diner and tells her that Bella deleted the photos from the shoot. She then informs Nikau that she will not be paying him, and he tells her it is fine as long as she stays away from Bella.

Allegra Freeman

Allegra Freeman, played by Laura McDonald, made her first appearances on 29 April 2021. McDonald's character and casting details were announced on 23 April 2021. The character was introduced as part of a big storyline set in the modelling industry centred around Nikau Parata (Kawakawa Fox-Reo) and Bella Nixon (Courtney Miller). McDonald confirmed the plot would also focus on disordered eating, as well as body image from male and female perspectives involving social media. Of her casting, McDonald stated: "I am a 25-year-old size 10 woman, so when this audition brief came to me I kind of assumed I was past it age-wise. I'm also just not in the right size bracket to even be considered for the role. They have done an amazing job." Allegra was billed as a "sexy and scandalous model" who works with Nikau. She was also called "morally challenged" by Kerry Harvey of Stuff.

Allegra is being photographed by Emmett Ellison (Jaime Robbie Reyne) when he notices Bella Nixon watching on. He invites her to sit in the rest of the session. Nikau Parata is booked to appear with Allegra for a clothing campaign, but he struggles to relax and Allegra advises him to look at her the way he looks at Bella. The rest of the shoot is a success and Nikau thanks Allegra for her help. Their agent Sienna Blake (Rose Riley) arranges an impromptu photoshoot for Nikau in Summer Bay and asks Allegra to take part. Sienna tells her to keep Nikau focused, as he could be good for her career. Nikau finds it hard to focus and Sienna directs him and Allegra to get closer together. She also tells Allegra to bring more sex appeal and then orders her to kiss Nikau on her cue, which Bella witnesses. Nikau ends the photoshoot early to go after Bella. Sienna later tells Allegra not to worry about what happened. Allegra helps Nikau increase his social media presence with some new photos. She gives him advice about body image and then hands him an appetite suppressant made by a friend. Allegra continues to help Nikau with his social media following. When Bella asks her to back off from Nikau, Allegra tells her that he is not her type. Sienna asks Allegra to go to Bella and Emmett's photo exhibition and create a wedge between Nikau and Bella, or the Japanese assignment will be cancelled. Allegra finds and uses Bella's phone to send a text to Nikau telling him the exhibition is opening late. She continues to text Nikau that he does not need to rush and deletes his replies. Sienna asks Allegra for something more, as Nikau is getting restless, so she sends back photos of Emmett and Bella looking intimate. Sienna calls Allegra and Nikau for a last minute fashion shoot in the Bay. Bella is hired as their photographer and she confronts Allegra for deleting the texts from Nikau and sending him the photo of her and Emmett. Nikau struggles to relax during the shoot and Allegra reveals that she knows about his one-night stand with Sienna. She tells him to get it together as she will not let him mess things up for her. Nikau also confronts Allegra about the texts and for messing up his life, while Allegra tells him that the Japan trip is her last chance to make it big. She refuses to take the blame for Nikau having sex with Sienna, and advises him to do what Sienna wants. Later at Salt, Allegra teases Sienna about wanting Bella to fail and torturing Nikau. Allegra tells her that getting him offside could jeopardise the Japan trip. Nikau later quits the agency, after the truth about him and Sienna comes out.

Emmett Ellison

Emmett Ellison, played by Jaime Robbie Reyne, made his first appearances on 29 April 2021. Reyne's casting details were announced on 23 April 2021. Reyne said he "leapt" at the role when it came up after his plans to go on tour with his band were cancelled due to the COVID-19 pandemic. He explained: "I had just moved to Sydney from Melbourne and a month later lockdown happened. I had a tour lined up that was going to keep me busy for the year and I remember the week before lockdown happened going out and celebrating the tour. And then, all of a sudden, live music was the first thing to be pulled. I had just moved into a new house and was thinking, 'OK, so where do we go from here?'" Reyne's character is introduced as part of a big storyline set in the modelling industry and centred around Nikau Parata (Kawakawa Fox-Reo) and Bella Nixon (Courtney Miller). It also focuses on "body image and the social-media pressure". Emmett is a professional photographer who Bella is invited to work with, however, she realises that "life behind the lens isn't what she expects." Reyne was able to bring personal experience to the role, as he modelled when he was younger, his mother was a model, and his godmother was a photographic agent. Reyne reprised the role the following year, as Emmett returns to the Bay to offer Bella a job overseas.

While photographing Allegra Freeman (Laura McDonald), Emmett notices Bella Nixon watching and he invites her to sit in on the rest of the session. When he finishes, Bella talks with him about the lens he is using. Her boyfriend Nikau Parata and his agent Sienna Blake (Rose Riley) enter the studio and Bella realises who Emmett is. Nikau struggles in his photoshoot and Emmett tries to give him some direction, but Nikau walks out. When he and Bella return, Emmett asks Bella to give Nikau the directions, as she has worked with him before. The rest of the photoshoot is a success and Sienna is pleased with the photographs. After Nikau and Allegra take part in a shoot for a clothing campaign, they all attend an after party, where Emmett tries to get Bella to dance. He then offers to deal with Sienna, so Nikau can come and spend time with her and her friends. Days later, Emmett and Sienna turn up at the Parata's house and Nikau's uncle Ari Parata (Rob Kipa-Williams) invites them to stay for dinner. Emmett goes over Bella's early work, and he, Sienna, Nikau and Bella go to Salt for drinks. Sienna arranges a photoshoot for Nikau and Allegra the following morning. Allegra kisses Nikau during the shoot, which Bella witnesses. Emmett later warns her to get away from the industry while she still can. Emmett meets Mackenzie Booth (Emily Weir) at Salt and they spend the night together. Emmett argues with Sienna about her manipulation of Nikau and Bella. He eventually tells Bella that Sienna threatened to end her internship in order to keep Nikau in line. Emmett assures Bella that she is talented and offers to collaborate on a photography exhibition with her. Emmett spends the night with Mackenzie again, but her brother Dean Thompson (Patrick O'Connor) warns him to stay away from her. Mackenzie leaves a number of voicemails on Emmett's phone, so he comes to Salt to tell her that their fling is over, causing her to chase him out of Salt. Sienna tries to lure Emmett back to her agency, and away from the exhibition, with the promise of a big client and more money, but he rejects her offer. Emmett suggests that he and Bella hold a smaller exhibition in preparation for the one in the city. Mackenzie allows them to hold it at Salt and it is a success. The following morning, Emmett is injured when he is caught up in the La Cucaracha taco van explosion. He suffers flash burns to both corneas and Tori Morgan (Penny McNamee) tells him that he might not regain sight in his left eye. Emmett is admitted to an eye hospital out of town, but he returns after Dean Thompson (Patrick O'Connor) contacts him to let him know that Nikau cheated on Bella with Sienna. Emmett talks with Bella and convinces her to carry on with the exhibition. She also tells him that she deleted the photos she took from Nikau's latest shoot. Emmett comes across Sienna in the Diner and when she tells him that she needs the photos from Bella, he informs her that Bella deleted them and lies about not having copies.

Rachel Young

Rachel Young, played by Marny Kennedy, made her first appearance on 24 May 2021. Kennedy's casting was confirmed in early 2021, after paparazzi photographs of her filming with actor Ditch Davey (Christian Green) were released. Kennedy was also pictured wearing a neck brace. Home and Away marks Kennedy's first soap opera role. Of her character's introduction, Kennedy stated: "Rachel lands in Home and Away in quite a different way. It is not your normal entry into Summer Bay, it is a bit of a crash land." For her character's storyline, Kennedy had to wear a halo brace and she explained that it took around half an hour to assemble and then fit it to her. She said that by the end, she "had it down to an art and I'm proud that I was able to just flick it on and off."

Rachel bumps into Christian Green as she is leaving the Blue Bird Skydiving office. She admits that she is nervous ahead of her first solo skydive, which is a post-divorce present from her friends. Christian tells her that he has never done anything like skydiving before and is not sure he will get to jump today, but Rachel assures him that he will. Rachel is seriously injured after falling to the ground during her skydive. She is treated by Christian, who has just finished booking his own lesson when the call about Rachel comes through to the office. Christian recognises that Rachel is going into shock and attempts to calm her, before she is taken to Northern Districts Hospital. Rachel's x-rays show that her skull has separated from her spine and is only being held in place by ligaments. Christian informs Rachel that she has suffered a rare atlanto-occipital dislocation, but her spine is intact and he is organising a halo brace for her. Christian reassures Rachel that she is not going to die and he will get her through it. Rachel's condition steadily improves and Christian spends time with her to monitor her progress. Rachel learns that he has postponed his wedding to Tori Morgan (Penny McNamee) and she feels guilty that he chose her over his own wedding. 

Christian tells Rachel that he almost died and it made him question everything. He believes that he survived in order to be at the skydiving site to save her. Christian decides to pass Rachel's care to another doctor, but she tells him that if he had ignored that feeling, she would not be alive. She tells him that she actually booked the skydive herself, so may be there was a reason she was there that day too. Rachel's condition steadily improves and she is able to walk around the hospital. Nurse Jasmine Delaney (Sam Frost) tells Rachel that the physio will be taking over her care soon. Tori later finds Christian asleep in Rachel's room when he is meant to be keeping an eye on her brother, and she confronts Rachel about their connection. A couple of weeks later, while they are talking, Christian tells Rachel that he and Tori are taking some time apart. He later calms her down when she suffers a panic attack and arranges some days out to the beach for her. Christian informs Rachel that she is ready to have the halo brace removed and for her to go home. She tells him that it is not necessary a good thing, as she will not see as much of him anymore and he realises that she has feelings for him. She points out that they have a connection, but he tells her that he loves Tori and only sees her as a friend, which she accepts. After Christian removes the brace, Rachel tells him she going to visit the beach one more time to say goodbye. As she is leaving, Rachel walks into the road and is hit by a car. She is brought to the hospital, where Christian takes over resuscitation, but she dies from her injuries.

Cash Newman

Cash Newman, played by Nicholas Cartwright, made his first appearance on 14 June 2021. The character and Cartwright's casting were revealed during a promotional trailer released on 8 June. Home and Away marks Cartwright's first television role since his graduation from National Institute of Dramatic Art (NIDA). Cartwright had spent six years in the army, before he completed a three-year course at NIDA. The COVID-19 pandemic affected his search for acting work, and he applied to join both the New South Wales Police Force and the Australian Federal Police, while continuing auditions. Cartwright originally auditioned for the guest role of Lewis Hayes (later played by Luke Arnold), but he admitted that he was happy not to have won the part, as Cash was "a much better fit for him." Of joining Home and Away, Cartwright told Kerry Harvey of stuff.co.nz "The exposure the show gets is nothing like I've ever been used to before but, having said that, I'm really excited by it all and it's a real privilege to be here."

Cash is Summer Bay's new police constable. Cartwright felt that his military background, as well as his understanding of rank, helped him with the role. He was aware that the Bay was not the best place to be a police officer, after three previous constables were killed-off and Colby Thorne (Tim Franklin), the officer he replaced, serving a long prison sentence. Cartwright commented "There seems to be a curse, for sure." Cash's "welcome to town is pretty serious" when he has to arrest Justin Morgan (James Stewart), before leading an investigation into a body that washes up. Although billed as a "hot cop", Cartwright said there would be more to his character "than meets the eye." In an interview with Inside Soap's Sarah Ellis, Cartwright said there were skeletons in Cash's closet and he was not the "level-headed guy that he appears to be..." He also said playing a police constable was one of his favourite parts of the job, as he gets to portray all the family and relationship dramas that other characters have, but he also gets to jumps into a police car and chase down a criminal. Cash's sister Felicity Newman (Jacqui Purvis) is later introduced to the serial, and Cartwright told Ellis that he and Purvis had a "fantastic rapport". He said Felicity was the only person Cash could be himself around. Cash also forms a romantic relationship with Jasmine Delaney (Sam Frost). Cartwright thought the couple were "made for each other", and explained "It's just a really nice love story, which is quite rare in soap. They're going from strength to strength, and I'm really excited to see where the writers go with it next." He added that he had a good working relationship with Frost and that they were both looking forward to Cash and Jasmine's romance continuing.

Logan Bennett

Logan Bennett, played by Harley Bonner, made his first appearance on 10 August 2021. The character and Bonner's casting was announced on 25 March 2021. Of joining the serial, Bonner stated "It's been a while since I've had the privilege of working on a program that's such a hallmark of Australian television. I'm happy to say I picked it back up a lot faster than expected. I really love working on shows like Home and Away, I love my character and I can't wait for Australia to meet him." Bonner filmed some of his first scenes in the studio, before taking part in a week long shoot in Yass as part of the show's mid-season cliffhanger storyline, which introduces his character. Logan's introduction sees him attend the scene of a car accident, involving three of the show's established characters. Clips of Logan helping to load a patient onto a medical helicopter saw him mistaken for a paramedic, but Bonner explained that he is actually a trauma surgeon who has served overseas.

Logan ends up coming to Summer Bay to perform a life saving operation, before deciding to stay to "see his patient's journey through from start to finish". Bonner stated: "That's the main brunt of the character at this point. He's coming in and he's got some more uncouth ways of operating – figuratively and literally – than what Australia is used to and particularly what Summer Bay is used to. But he is effective and he's very confident in what he does. He's a real cheeky character and he's a lot of fun to play." Bonner also called his character "a bit of a nomad" and described him as "capable, compassionate, intelligent and fun." Bonner also expressed his interest in finding out more about his character during his time in the Bay. A few months later, it was confirmed that Logan would be a love interest for Mackenzie Booth (Emily Weir). On 8 January 2022, it was announced that Bonner had left Home and Away, as he had not been vaccinated against COVID-19 and Seven Network requires all staff working on their productions to be vaccinated. A show spokeswoman confirmed Bonner would not be returning to set when filming resumes on the serial and that the role of Logan will not be recast. The character's "abrupt" exit aired on 6 June 2022. After almost being charged with causing death by dangerous driving and breaking up with Mackenzie, Logan decides to re-join the Army Medical Corps. Bonner's voice is heard, as Mackenzie listens to a voicemail from Logan apologising for not telling her that he was leaving.

Felicity Newman

Felicity "Flick" Newman, played by Jacqui Purvis, made her first appearance on 19 August 2021. Purvis's casting was announced in April 2021, after she photographed filming alongside cast member Ethan Browne at Palm Beach. Dan Seddon of Digital Spy believed that she would become a potential love interest for Browne's character Tane Parata. Further details about Purvis's character, including her name, were released on 26 July, as she was featured in a promotional trailer for the show. Purvis originally auditioned for the role of Mackenzie Booth, prior to being cast as Felicity. She told Kerry Harvey of Stuff that she was grateful she did not get cast as Mackenzie, as she felt Flick was "a dream come true as a character." She continued: "I get to transition from vulnerable and sensitive with my family issues and mental health to the fun side, which is that she is a little pocket rocket who has no filter. So it's a huge, huge blessing and I'm just so grateful that I get to play it." Shortly before her first scenes aired, it was revealed that Felicity is the sister of Cash Newman (Nicholas Cartwright), Summer Bay's newest police officer.

Flick was initially billed as "a firecracker with an abundance of confidence and no filter – which can get her into a lot of trouble." Her first scenes see her attract Tane's attention when she dances on top of a bar. Purvis described her as "a kind of cannonball" and thought it was "a gift" to be given the chance to portray "a multi-layered character." Flick and Cash's fictional backstory was slowly revealed to viewers after their introductions. Their father committed suicide after when he was left to raise them alone and his farm suffered from drought. Flick struggled to come to terms with what happened, causing her to make one bad decision after another. Purvis felt privileged to play out the long lasting effects of suicide on the people left behind. She carried out her own research into the subject, wanting to portray it accurately and with sensitivity. She also spoke with people who had experienced a suicide in the family. She told Harvey: "It's different for everyone, obviously, so I just had to choose something specific for Flick and how she would react to that situation. I just needed to cover all bases and make sure that I was doing it justice and was covering it sensitively. It is very hard, but also so enlightening at the same time." Purvis reckoned Flick would always struggle with her father's death. She added that she understands her character, but Flick often does things she would not consider, like dancing on a bar.

Theo Poulos

Theo Poulos, played by Matt Evans, made his first appearance on 9 September 2021. The character and Evans' casting details were confirmed on 6 September. Evans had little acting experience prior to getting the role, but he said he was learning each day. He stated: "It is like getting paid to go to school. My first day in the studio, I kind of had a bit of a freak out because it's just a lot of people around and I didn't know what I was doing. I'm just trying to learn on the job." Prior to his arrival, it was revealed that Theo would have a connection to one of the show's main characters. It was later revealed that he is the nephew of established regular Leah Patterson (Ada Nicodemou).

The character was initially billed as "a troubled guy in his 20s", although Evans said he would not be "as bad as he appears." Evans explained that his character is fun and often acts first and thinks later, which is what gets him into trouble. He added that Theo "has a good heart when you get down to it." Theo is first seen being pulled over by constable Cash Newman (Nicholas Cartwright) for speeding. He claims he is visiting his family following the death of his aunt, so Cash escorts him to Summer Bay, where Theo admits that he has been kicked out of home by his father. His father is Leah's eldest brother Dimitri Poulos (Salvatore Coco). Leah wants to give Theo a second chance and asks her partner and mechanic Justin Morgan (James Stewart) to hire him. Kerry Harvey of Stuff said Theo "is a far-from-model employee." The character also comes between young couple Ryder Jackson (Lukas Radovich) and Chloe Anderson (Sam Barrett). Evans told Harvey that he believed Theo would redeem himself, especially as there were many secrets still to come out, including his relationship with his father and some things he has tried to keep hidden. He added "It will take time, but the audience will learn why he is the way he is and then they will become a little bit forgiving of him." Coco reprised his role as Theo's father Dimitri in April 2022. Leah invites him to the Bay, unaware of his and Theo's abusive history. In May 2022, Evans received a nomination for the Logie Award for Most Popular New Talent.

Others

References

External links
Characters and cast at 7plus
Characters and cast at the Internet Movie Database

, 2021
, Home and Away
2021 in Australian television